The Liberty Flames baseball team is a varsity intercollegiate athletic team of Liberty University in Lynchburg, Virginia, United States. The team is a member of the ASUN Conference, which is part of the National Collegiate Athletic Association's Division I. Liberty's first baseball team was fielded in 1974. The team plays its home games at Liberty Baseball Stadium in Lynchburg, Virginia. The Flames are coached by Scott Jackson. The team colors are red, white and blue.

Year-by-year results

Major League Baseball
As of the 2022 Major League Baseball season, 79 former Flames have been drafted by MLB teams.  Seven players have made it to the majors: Sid Bream, Randy Tomlin, Doug Brady, Lee Guetterman, Josh Rupe, Ian Parmley, and most recently, Ryan Cordell.  Additionally, Tony Beasley, a former infielder with the Flames, served as the interim manager of the Texas Rangers during the 2022 season.

See also
List of NCAA Division I baseball programs

References

External links
 

 
Baseball teams established in 1974
1974 establishments in Virginia